Fernando Cebrián (1929–2009) was a Spanish film and television actor.

Selected filmography
 The Legion of Silence (1956)
 A Land for All (1962)
 Marisol rumbo a Río (1963)
 The Spy Who Loved Flowers (1966)
 Target Goldseven (1966)
  (1971-1974)
 The 
Glass Ceiling (1971)
 Iguana (1988)

References

Bibliography 
 José María Caparrós Lera. Historia del cine español. T&B, 2007.

External links 
 

1929 births
2009 deaths
Spanish male film actors
People from Bilbao